Helen Crook (born 20 November 1971) is a British former professional tennis player.

Biography
Before turning professional, Crook attended college in the United States, as a journalism student at the University of South Carolina. She formed a doubles partnership in college tennis with another British player, Victoria Davies. The pair made the semifinals of the 1994 NCAA Doubles Championships.

Crook, who was based in Essex, began competing on the international circuit in 1996. All of her WTA Tour and Wimbledon main-draw appearances were in doubles, a format in which she reached No. 155 in the world. She made two WTA Tour doubles quarterfinals, both with regular doubles partner Victoria Davies, at the 1999 Warsaw Cup and the 2001 Birmingham Classic. She featured in the women's doubles at Wimbledon on eight occasions and twice in mixed doubles. Her only grand slam win came when partnering Anna Hawkins at the 2003 Wimbledon Championships, with the pair overcoming Barbara Schett and Patty Schnyder, before being beaten in the second round by Martina Navratilova and Svetlana Kuznetsova.

She was one of the founders of GB Tennis Girls, an organisation supporting women's tennis.

ITF Circuit finals

Singles (0–2)

Doubles (11–15)

References

External links
 
 

1971 births
Living people
British female tennis players
English female tennis players
South Carolina Gamecocks women's tennis players
Tennis people from Essex